Iru Pata (Aymara iru spiny Peruvian feather grass, pata stone bench, step, "Peruvian feather grass step") is a  mountain in the Bolivian Andes. It is located in the La Paz Department, Inquisivi Province, Colquiri Municipality. Iru Pata lies southwest of Jaqi Jiwata.

References 

Mountains of La Paz Department (Bolivia)